Alejandro 'Álex' Rubio Brito (born 23 July 1993) is a Spanish footballer who plays for Peña Deportiva Rociera as a forward or a winger.

Club career
Born in San Fernando, Cádiz, Rubio played youth football with native Andalusia giants Sevilla FC. In February 2012, still a junior, he began appearing professionally with the B-team in Segunda División B.

Rubio made his official debut with the main squad on 2 September 2012, playing 15 minutes in a 0–0 La Liga away draw against Rayo Vallecano. On 30 January 2014, after another spell with the reserves, he moved abroad and joined Cypriot First Division club AC Omonia.

On 30 July 2015, Rubio returned to Spain, signing for CD Alcoyano in the third division.

References

External links

1993 births
Living people
People from San Fernando, Cádiz
Sportspeople from the Province of Cádiz
Spanish footballers
Footballers from Andalusia
Association football wingers
Association football forwards
La Liga players
Segunda División B players
Tercera División players
Divisiones Regionales de Fútbol players
Sevilla Atlético players
Sevilla FC players
CD Alcoyano footballers
UCAM Murcia CF players
Real Balompédica Linense footballers
CD Badajoz players
CP Cacereño players
Cypriot First Division players
AC Omonia players
Spain youth international footballers
Spanish expatriate footballers
Expatriate footballers in Cyprus
Spanish expatriate sportspeople in Cyprus